The Anti-Personnel Mines Convention Implementation Act 2000, is a Malaysian laws which enacted to implement the Convention on the Prohibition of the Use, Stockpiling, Production and Transfer of Anti-Personnel Mines and on their Destruction; and for other matters connected therewith.

Preamble
WHEREAS according to Article 17 of the Convention on the Prohibition of the Use, Stockpiling, Production and Transfer of Anti-Personnel Mines and on their Destruction ---
"1. This Convention shall enter into force on the first day of the sixth month after the month in which the 40th Instrument of ratification, acceptance, approval or accession has been deposited.
2. For any State which deposits its instrument of ratification, acceptance, approval or accession after the date of the deposit of the 40th instrument of ratification, acceptance, approval or accession, this Convention shall enter into force on the first day of the sixth month after the date on which that State has deposited its instrument of ratification, acceptance, approval or accession.":
AND WHEREAS the said 40th instrument of ratification was so deposited by Burkina Faso on the sixteenth day of September 1998 and the Convention therefore entered into force on the first day of March 1999:
AND WHEREAS Malaysia deposited her instrument of accession on the twenty-second day of April 1999 and therefore in accordance with the said Article 17 the Convention entered into force as far as Malaysia is concerned on the first day of October 1999;

Structure
The Anti-Personnel Mines Convention Implementation Act 2000, in its current form (1 January 2006), consists of 24 sections and no schedule (including no amendment), without separate Part.

References

External links
 Anti-Personnel Mines Convention Implementation Act 2000 

2000 in Malaysian law
Malaysian federal legislation